Luisa Sanfelice is a 1942 Italian historical drama film directed by Leo Menardi and starring Laura Solari, Massimo Serato and Osvaldo Valenti. The film is an adaptation of a novel by Alexandre Dumas based on the story of Luisa Sanfelice (1764-1800) an Italian aristocrat executed in Naples by Ferdinand I for supporting a Republican attempt to overthrow him during the French Revolutionary Wars. Horatio Nelson and Lady Hamilton both feature prominently.

It was made at the Cinecittà Studios in Rome. One of the film's screenwriters was Vittorio Mussolini, the son of dictator Benito Mussolini, who was heavily involved in the Italian film industry. The film's sets were designed by Virgilio Marchi.

Main cast
 Laura Solari as Luisa Sanfelice  
 Massimo Serato as Ferdinando Ferri  
 Osvaldo Valenti as Nelson
 Carlo Ninchi as Il banchiere Gerardo Bacher  
 Hilde Sessak as Lady Hamilton
 Stelio Carnabuci as Andrea Sanfelice - marito de Luisa  
 Ada Dondini as Donna Camilla Molinis  
 Armando Migliari as Lord Aston  
 Jole Ferrari as la principessa Clementina  
 Amelia Perrella as Domestica di casa Sanfelice  
 Amina Pirani Maggi as Una popplana  
 Oreste Fares as Amico fedele di donna Camilla  
 Achille Majeroni as Altro amico di donna Camilla

References

Bibliography 
 Marrone, Gaetana & Puppa, Paolo. Encyclopedia of Italian Literary Studies. Routledge, 2006.

External links 

1942 films
Italian historical drama films
1940s historical drama films
1940s Italian-language films
Films directed by Leo Menardi
Films set in Naples
Films set in the 1790s
Films set in the 1800s
French Revolutionary Wars films
Films based on French novels
Films based on works by Alexandre Dumas
Cultural depictions of Emma, Lady Hamilton
Cultural depictions of Horatio Nelson
Italian black-and-white films
Films shot at Cinecittà Studios
1942 drama films
Films scored by Renzo Rossellini
Cultural depictions of Italian women
1940s Italian films